This list of museums in Quebec, Canada contains museums which are defined for this context as institutions (including nonprofit organizations, government entities, and private businesses) that collect and care for objects of cultural, artistic, scientific, or historical interest and make their collections or related exhibits available for public viewing. Also included are non-profit art galleries and university art galleries.  Museums that exist only in cyberspace (i.e., virtual museums) are not included.

See also List of museums in Montreal for museums in the Montreal region.
See also List of museums in Quebec City for museums in Quebec City.

Museums

Defunct museums
 Aux couleurs de la campagne, Saint-Jean-sur-Richelieu
 Centre national des naufrages du Saint-Laurent,  Baie-Trinité 
 Fort de la Martiniere, Lévis
 Jardin des glaciers, Baie-Comeau
 Musée Bon-Pasteur, closed in 2014
 Musée de bateaux miniatures et légendes du Bas-Saint-Laurent, Rivière-du-Loup, closed in 2014
 Musée du Domaine, Pohénégamook
 Musée Normantique, Saint-Alexandre, closed and contents auctioned in 2015
 Parc de l'aventure basque en Amérique, Trois-Pistoles
 Quebec Wax Museum (Musée de Cire), closed in 2007, figures now at the Musée de la civilisation

See also
Culture of Quebec
Quebec
Nature centres in Quebec

References

Bonjour Quebec
Société des musées québécois

Quebec
 
Museums